Rubivirus is a genus of viruses. It contains three species.

Taxonomy
The following three species are assigned to the genus:

 Rubivirus rubellae, commonly called rubella virus
 Rubivirus ruteetense, commonly called ruhugu virus
 Rubivirus strelense, commonly called rustrela virus

References

Virus genera